Jon R. Collins (May 7, 1923 – March 12, 1987) was a justice of the Supreme Court of Nevada from 1966 to 1971.

Born in Ely, Nevada, Collins attended White Pine High School, receiving his undergraduate degree from the University of Pennsylvania, and his law degree from the Georgetown University Law Center.

On June 5, 1966, Governor Grant Sawyer appointed Collins to a seat on the court vacated by Milton Benjamin Badt. Collins was elected November 1966 to the four-year unexpired term.

References

1923 births
1987 deaths
People from Ely, Nevada
University of Pennsylvania alumni
Georgetown University Law Center alumni
Justices of the Nevada Supreme Court